Jakartovice is a municipality and village in Opava District in the Moravian-Silesian Region of the Czech Republic. It has about 1,100 inhabitants.

Administrative parts
Villages of Bohdanovice, Deštné and Hořejší Kunčice are administrative parts of Jakartovice.

History
The first written mention of Jakartovice is from 1250. Bohdanovice was first mentioned in 1265, Deštné at the beginning of the 14th century and Hořejší Kunčice in 1403.

In 1974 the villages of Bohdanovice, Deštné, Hořejší Kunčice, and the territory of former villages of Kerhartice and Medlice were joined to Jakartovice and since then they make up one municipality.

Sights

The most valuable buildings are the Baroque Church of the Nativity of the Virgin Mary built in 1755, and a complex of historic buildings in Deštné – the Baroque Deštné Castle from the 18th century (rebuilt from a fort from 1408) with a park, and the Gothic Church of the Visitation of Our Lady from the second half of the 14th century.

References

External links

Villages in Opava District